El Rostro de la Muerte (Spanish for "The Face of Death") is the fourth studio album by American thrash metal band Hirax, released on November 16, 2009. It is the first to feature the brothers Steve Harrison (bass) and Lance Harrison (guitar), and the last with Glenn Rogers.

Music videos were made for the songs "El Rostro de la Muerte (The Face of Death)" and "Broken Neck".

Track listing

A picture disc vinyl edition by Deep Six Records contains a 7" single. The track listing is as follows:

Personnel 
Katon W. De Pena (Bobby Johnson) - vocals
Glenn Rogers - guitar
Lance Harrison - guitar
Steve Harrison - bass
Jorge Iacobellis - drums

Production
Ed Repka - cover art
John Haddad - recording
Maor Appelbaum - mastering
Reinaldo Lopez - executive producer
Andy Haller - mixing

References 

2009 albums
Hirax albums
Season of Mist albums
Albums with cover art by Ed Repka